DocuShare is a content management system developed by Xerox Corporation. DocuShare makes use of open standards and allows for managing content, integrating it with other business systems, and developing customized and packaged software applications.

History

Xerox DocuShare was originally developed by Xerox’s research centers as an application for internal use (named AmberWeb). The product was the first web-based document management tool offered to the market in 1997.

Since its initial launch, DocuShare has added capabilities in workflow/business process management, production imaging, records and retention management,  social collaboration, and enterprise scalability.  With version 5.0 in 2006, Xerox launched DocuShare CPX and a flexible licensing model that allows customers to mix read-only, guest (public), basic content services and more CM seats as they need. As of version 6.6, there are four separate DocuShare products.

Product

The DocuShar Content Management Platform includes four products:
 DocuShare Express delivers content management tailored to SMBs, for managing digital documents and converting paper content to digital.
 DocuShare provides document management, collaboration, image capture, and Web publishing capabilities to support information sharing in an enterprise or department. Add-ons include records management, lifecycle management, team workspaces, enterprise workflow, capture, and eForms.
 DocuShare Enterprise meets enterprise content management (ECM) requirements for large deployments.
 DocuShare Education is a special configuration for schools and higher education institutions.

Developer tools: DocuShare Developer Environment – A J2EE SDK for integrating DocuShare with other business systems, and building content-centric applications.

Solutions: DocuShare Virtual Filing System – Combines software, hardware, and consulting services to convert paper-based filing into a digital content management system.

Hosted solutions: DocuShare is also available as a hosted offering by Xerox’s outsourced services business.

Architecture and features

DocuShare has been noted for the simplicity of its UI and administration.

DocuShare is a multi-tier, Java SE-based (rather than Java EE) platform with an architecture and developer environment that allows interoperability. The platform uses a Tomcat server and various OEM engines including Autonomy Corporation's (for indexing, eForms and BPM) and records management from IBM. Xerox has built out the technology components using a Java SE architecture and adding workflow and search engines. It also contains wiki, blog and comment features, for social networking. For imaging, it includes a content intake manager (an XMl Parser), ability to e-mail directly to a DocuShare collection, scan cover sheets (with DataGlyph technology formerly in the Xerox FlowPort and PaperWorks products), and an OCR engine optional add-on (provided by Nuance).

The Autonomy search engine is used to search for documents and metadata (formerly a Verity search engine was used).

Terminology
In DocuShare, a "collection" is a folder for the storage of information. Multiple collections can be nested inside each other to form a tree.

Workflow/BPM
Content Rules are pre-defined workflows that have been implemented into the product UI. The content rules can perform specific functions on a collection or document. They allow a lay user to pre-define a workflow by stepping through a process that will take place when a specific event happens: for example, if a document moves into a collection, the workflow can move it to another area, perform OCR, and perform steps based on the document’s contents.

To create more complex workflows, the DocuShare Developer Environment provides a Workflow software developer’s kit (SDK) and design tool.

Imaging
As of 2007, Xerox DocuShare has a front end imaging component in Scan Cover Sheets, which use proprietary DataGlyph technology. An Extensible Interface (EIP) connector is also provided for Xerox MFP scanning. (EIP provides direct access to a repository from the touch panel of a Xerox MFP.) DocuShare can also be used with third party imaging tools including ABBYY, Pharos, Kofax, Cardiff Teleform, SRC Conveyor, WaterWare ScanManager, Polgroup StrategicValueWare, NSI AutoStore, Xerox Smart Document Travel, SRC File Clerk, ScanFlowStore, eCopy, Visioneer OneTouch, EzeScan, Nuance PaperPort, and DSI Software Systems. These systems and others connect DocuShare with multi-function printers (MFPs) and scanners.

See also
 Business process management (BPM)
 Document imaging
 Document management
 Enterprise content management (ECM)
 List of content management systems (CMS)
 Records management

References

External links
"Official Xerox DocuShare website"
"Buyer’s Lab Spring Pick: DocuShare 6.0"
"Paper-to-digital business process automation"

Content management systems
Document management systems